The Legislative Assembly of the State of Singapore was the legislature of the Government of Singapore from 1955 to 1965 and is the predecessor of the Parliament of Singapore. The Rendel Constitution, proposed in 1953, sought to give the local population more self-governance as the Merdeka independence movement grew. The Constitution took effect upon the conclusion of the 1955 general election, creating the new Legislative Assembly to replace the Legislative Council of Singapore. In contrast to the Legislative Council, the majority of seats in the Legislative Assembly in 1955 were allotted by election rather than appointment by the British colonial government. 25 seats were elected and 7 were appointed. The British colonial government still reserved significant power, such as that of veto and control of certain aspects of the government.

Ensuing activism for self-governance from the United Kingdom by Chief Ministers David Marshall and Lim Yew Hock led to a further amendment of the Constitution of Singapore in 1958, which proposed a fully elected body of 51 seats. This proposal took effect upon the conclusion of the 1959 general election. 

Upon the independence of Singapore in 1965, the Legislative Assembly was succeeded by the Parliament of Singapore.

List of sessions

See also
Legislative Council of the Straits Settlements
Legislative Council of Singapore
Parliament of Singapore

Notes

References

Defunct unicameral legislatures
History of Singapore